José María Ramírez López (born 27 July 1982) is a Mexican former professional footballer who played as a midfielder. As of 2023, he is the president of Chapulineros de Oaxaca.

References

External links
José Ramírez on Ascenso MX

Liga MX players
Living people
1982 births
Footballers from Mexico City
Mexican footballers
Association football midfielders
Alebrijes de Oaxaca players
La Piedad footballers
Tecos F.C. footballers
Cruz Azul Hidalgo footballers